The enzyme 3-aminobutyryl-CoA ammonia-lyase (EC 4.3.1.14) catalyzes the chemical reaction

L-3-aminobutyryl-CoA  crotonoyl-CoA + NH3

This enzyme belongs to the family of lyases, specifically ammonia lyases, which cleave carbon-nitrogen bonds.  The systematic name of this enzyme class is L-3-aminobutyryl-CoA ammonia-lyase (crotonoyl-CoA-forming). Other names in common use include L-3-aminobutyryl-CoA deaminase, and L-3-aminobutyryl-CoA ammonia-lyase.

References 

 
 

EC 4.3.1
Enzymes of unknown structure